Piló dels Senyalets is a mountain in Catalonia, Spain.

References

Mountains of Catalonia